Toby Freeman  (born 27 October 1987) is an English rugby union player who plays for London Scottish in the RFU Championship.

Freeman starting with Penryn based in Cornwall, then played for Exeter Chiefs whilst studying at the University of Exeter, before making the move overseas to play for Spanish side Ordizia, assisting them in winning the 2012 División de Honor de Rugby Cup, whilst also picking up the Man of the Match award in the process.

Freeman returned to the UK to sign for Rotherham Titans in the RFU Championship from the 2012–13 season. From the 2013–14 season, Freeman signed with rivals Nottingham for four seasons making over 80 appearances for the club. He then signed for Cornish Pirates from the 2017–18 season.

On 21 March 2019, Freeman makes his move to the Premiership Rugby for the first time in his career with Harlequins for the 2019–20 season. On 1 June 2020, Freeman returns to the Championship with London Scottish from the 2020–21 season to combine part time rugby with his career transition into becoming a financial advisor.

References

External links
Its Rugby Profile
Ultimate Rugby Profile

Living people
1987 births
Cornish Pirates players
English rugby union players
Exeter Chiefs players
Harlequin F.C. players
London Scottish F.C. players
Nottingham R.F.C. players
Rugby union locks
Rugby union players from London